Cynthia von Doom is a fictional character appearing in American comic books published by Marvel Comics. She is the mother of Doctor Doom and has magic-based abilities. Her powers and knowledge of spells have allowed her to contact demons and make deals with them for power.

Publication history
Cynthia von Doom first appeared in Astonishing Tales #8 and was created by Gerry Conway, Gene Colan, and Tom Palmer.

Fictional character biography

Cynthia was a sorceress. She was part of the Zefiro tribe, a group of Romani people that reside in Latveria. She was trained in sorcery by a Latverian mystic who would later use the alias of "Dizzy the Hun." Dizzy the Hun would later speak the eulogy over her grave in marvel Comics Super Special #1.

Cynthia married Werner von Doom, where Torval of the Zefiro played the fiddle.

When Cynthia was pregnant with Victor von Doom, she was imprisoned by the Baron Vladimir Fortunov, Latveria's tyrannical ruler, she encountered Lucas Cross, a fellow prisoner who has just been turned into a vampire. Some decades later in the future, Doctor Doom (upon learning of his mother's history) sent Blade back in time to free her. Blade frees her with the help of Cross, and Cynthia escapes after they fight off a group of vampires. 

Cynthia later gave birth to Victor von Doom. For a time, Cynthia led the Zefiro with a blend of power and compassion.

On Midsummer's Eve in Books of Doom #1, Cynthia cast a spell to summon Mephisto and make a deal with him in order to take back her people's homeland from the Baron. The deal backfired when she lost control of the magic Mephisto had granted her, and as a result every child in the village was killed. She fled into the woods after being wounded by a dying guardsman. Werner later found her body and she told him what happened before she died. Werner buried her body in an unmarked grave. Due to dying unconfessed, Cynthia was cursed to an eternity of damnation.

At Cynthia's funeral, Boris and the other Romani told Werner to take Victor and flee before the Baron found out what happened. 

Werner led the Zefiro to flee before the dawn. Werner tried to drop Cynthia's trunk of arcane objects into the river, but it reappeared in his wagon three nights later. Over the years, Werner tried to destroy Cynthia's trunk through various ways, but it could not be destroyed. He gave up and tried to lose Cynthia's trunk among his meager belongings.

In Fantastic Four Annual #2, the young Victor von Doom discovered his mother's trunk filled with potions and strange scientific secrets, thus spawning his interest in the arcane. While attending Empire State University, Victor invented the "Necrophone" and used it to contact his mother. His spirit saw that his mother was being tortured by Mephisto in Hell before the machine exploded, scarring Victor's face and getting him expelled from the university.

Doctor Doom used magic to summon Mephisto and agreed to duel him in exchange for his mother's soul. Every Midsummer's Eve, Doctor Doom would cast a spell calling up demons and battling them. He lost every time. His latest duel was with Kagrok the Killer. Though they fought to a standstill, Doctor Doom was defeated anyway.

In Iron Man I #150, Doctor Doom allied with Morgan le Fay to gain magic powers in order to help free his mother.

In Fantastic Four Annaul #20, on Midsummer's Eve, Doctor Doom sent his Swarmbots to abduct Franklin Richards from Four Freedoms Plaza and bring him to Latveria. Doctor Doom then summoned Mephisto and offered to trade Franklin Richards in exchange for his mother's soul. The meeting was interrupted by Kristoff Vernard, who had convinced the Doombots that he was the real Doctor Doom. Mephisto managed to take Franklin Richards anyway. At that point, Franklin Richards' powers surfaced, and he threatened to destroy Mephisto. Mephisto could not handle Franklin and banished him back to Earth. From a distance, someone that might be Cynthia was shown watching Franklin's encounter with Mephisto.

Having taken second place in the Aged Genghis/Vishanti contest, Doctor Doom was given a prize to make a boon with Doctor Strange. He made a request to Doctor Strange to take him to Hell to confront Mephisto and his legions. Doctor Doom appeared to have double-crossed Doctor Strange to offer him to Mephisto in exchange for his mother's soul. After Doctor Strange was in Mephisto's clutches, Cynthia's body was recreated by Mephisto and Cynthia learned of what Doctor Doom had to bargain with, causing the body to return to a statuesque state. Mephisto appeared to have the souls of Cynthia, Doctor Doom, and Doctor Strange until a device that Doctor Doom brought shattered Mephisto's crystal, freeing Doctor Strange. The three of them attacked Mephisto, who mocked their attacks and unleashed energy that would be enough to destroy them. Doctor Strange shielded Cynthia from the effigy. Doctor Strange then allowed Mephisto's attack to destroy it. Having refused to leave Hell under Doctor Doom's pact, Cynthia began to go through redemption enough to purify her soul. Mephisto could not tolerate Cynthia's now-pure soul and allowed her to ascend to a higher plane. Mephisto then allowed Doctor Doom and Doctor Strange to return to Earth.

When Doctor Doom decided to take on the mantle of Iron Man, Cynthia von Doom watched him do that through her cauldron.

Powers and abilities
Cynthia von Doom had magic-based abilities, such as a knowledge for spells which allowed her to contact demons and make deals with them for power.

In other media
 Cynthia von Doom appears in The Super Hero Squad Show episode "Mother of Doom", voiced by Charlie Adler. This version is shown in a female version of Doctor Doom's armor and was shown as imprisoned in Chthon's dimension. She is also shown to have nagging-related powers rather than mystical powers. After Doctor Doom conquers Chthon's dimension, he frees his mother, who changed her first name to Coco (as Cynthia was too "drab"). While Doctor Doom attends to some business, he instructs the Abomination and MODOK to monitor his mother and tend to her. While she is out in Super Hero City with the Abomination and MODOK, she uses her nagging abilities on the Hulk, who is unable to attack a female. When the Super Hero Squad members that are not in Chthon's dimension arrive, the Hulk manages to strike back. Doctor Doom's deal with Chthon has Coco withdrawn into Chthon's dimension. She is seen playing cards with Galactus' mother and an elderly version of Morgan le Fay. Coco von Doom tells them that she has found another way to contact her son. After receiving many invites from his mother on MaskFace, Doctor Doom comments that his mother is "evil". The character later appears in "Pedicure and Facial of Doom", where she uses Chthon to help turn Castle Doom into a spa that has Doombots as its staff by the time Doctor Doom, MODOK, and the Abomination return. The Super Hero Squad were able to defeat Coco von Doom and Chthon, who are remanded to S.H.I.E.L.D. custody, but Doctor Doom, MODOK, and the Abomination escaped.

References

External links

 

Characters created by Gerry Conway
Characters created by Gene Colan
Fictional characters who have made pacts with devils
Marvel Comics female characters
Marvel Comics characters who use magic
Romani comics characters
Marvel Comics witches
Doctor Doom
Latverians